Francesco Acquaviva d'Aragona (14 October 1665 – 9 January 1725) was an Italian Cardinal, who served as ambassador of Spain to the Holy See.

Life
Francesco Acquaviva was born 14 October 1665 in Naples, the son of Giosia III Acquaviva d'Aragona, 14th Duke of Atri, and Francesca Caracciolo. Grand-nephew of Cardinal Ottavio Acquaviva d'Aragona (iuniore) (1654). Uncle of Cardinal Troiano Acquaviva d’Aragona (1732). Grand-uncle of Cardinal Pasquale Acquaviva d'Aragona (1770). Other cardinals of the family were Giovanni Vincenzo Acquaviva d'Aragona (1542); Giulio Acquaviva d'Aragona (1570); and Ottavio Acquaviva d'Aragona (seniore) (1591).

He obtained a doctorate in utroque iure, both canon and civil law from the University of Fermo. He served as Vice-legate in Fermo, and was made a domestic prelate 25 November 1688. The following year, he was appointed Vice-legate in Ferrara. Francesco Acquaviva was consecrated titular archbishop of Larissa 22 December 1697. Francesco Acquaviva filled various offices under Popes Innocent XI, Alexander VIII, Innocent XII, and Clement XI, who created him Cardinal in the consistory of May 17, 1706.

He was nuncio to Spain, from April 6, 1700 until December 7, 1706. In 1708, due to the Austrian conquest of the Kingdom of Naples, he lost a number of ecclesiastical benefices, but was compensated by Philip V with the appointment as diplomatic representative of the Catholic court to the Holy See, as well as cardinal protector of Spain.  He was very loyal to Philip V, and sold his silverware to help the king bear the costs of the long war of succession and, in a critical moment, also saved the first wife of that sovereign, Luisa Maria Gabriella of Savoy. He participated in matters such as arranging the marriage of King Philip V and Princess Isabella Farnese of Parma, on August 20, 1714.  He resided at the Palazzo di Spagna in Rome.

In 1709, he was named Cardinal-protector of Santa Cecilia in Trastevere. He served as Camerlengo of the Sacred College of Cardinals, January 26, 1711 until March 2, 1712.Francesco Acquaviva participated in the conclave of 1721, which elected Pope Innocent XIII, and the conclave of 1724, which elected Pope Benedict XIII.

He was buried at Rome in the Church of Santa Cecilia.

Episcopal Lineage 
 Cardinal Scipione Rebiba
 Cardinal Giulio Antonio Santorio (1566)
 Cardinal Girolamo Bernerio, OP (1586)
 Archbishop Galeazzo Sanvitale (1604)
 Cardinal Ludovico Ludovisi (1621)
 Cardinal Luigi Caetani (1622)
 Cardinal Ulderico Carpegna (1630)
 Cardinal Paluzzo Paluzzi Altieri degli Albertoni (1666)
 Cardinal Gaspare Carpegna (1670)
 Cardinal Francesco Acquaviva (1697)

References 

Attribution

1665 births
1723 deaths
18th-century Italian cardinals
Cardinal-bishops of Sabina
Francesco Acquaviva
Apostolic Nuncios to Spain
Inquisitors of Malta